Phillip Matthew Adams (July 20, 1988 – April 8, 2021) was an American football cornerback. He played college football for the South Carolina State Bulldogs and was drafted in the seventh round of the 2010 NFL Draft by the San Francisco 49ers. He also played for the New England Patriots, Oakland Raiders, Seattle Seahawks, New York Jets, and Atlanta Falcons.

On April 8, 2021, suffering from the brain disease chronic traumatic encephalopathy, Adams shot and killed himself following a standoff with police in Rock Hill, South Carolina. He was identified by investigators as the gunman responsible for killing six people the day before.

Early life
Adams was born on July 20, 1988, in Rock Hill, South Carolina. He attended Rock Hill High School, where he played football and basketball.

College career
Adams attended South Carolina State University from 2006 to 2009. In his freshman year with the Bulldogs, Adams saw action as a backup and on special teams. He recorded 12 tackles and two interceptions, along with a 30-yard punt return. As a sophomore with the Bulldogs, he played in 11 games.

As a junior, Adams ranked sixth on the team (with 48 tackles) and led the team in interceptions (with five) and pass deflections (with nine). In his senior year, he was a First Team All-Mid-Eastern Athletic Conference selection after registering 48 tackles and three interceptions. That year, he also scored a touchdown on a pick six against Norfolk State.

Professional career

Adams was selected in the seventh round (224th overall) of the 2010 NFL Draft by the San Francisco 49ers. In week 16 against the St. Louis Rams on December 26, 2010, he broke his left ankle while blocking on the opening kickoff of the second half. The injury required Adams to have surgery, which included several screws being inserted into his leg. He was released by the 49ers on September 3, 2011.

On September 21, 2011, the New England Patriots signed Adams and Landon Cohen after season-ending injuries to Dan Koppen and Myron Pryor. He was waived on October 8, then re-signed on October 13 after Mike Wright went on injured reserve. On October 14, Adams was once again released to make room for Marcus Harrison, but was re-signed on October 18. On November 21, Adams recorded his first interception in the NFL. He was waived again on November 29. On December 20, 2011, Adams was signed by the Seattle Seahawks. He made only one appearance for the Seahawks in 2011. On August 31, 2012, the Seahawks cut Adams.

On September 1, 2012, Adams was signed by the Oakland Raiders. In 2012 for Oakland, Adams played in 15 of the Raiders' 16 games, with one interception (off of Peyton Manning) and 15 tackles. On December 28, 2012, he was placed on injured reserve. On March 12, 2013, he re-signed with the Raiders as a restricted free agent. Adams appeared in all 16 games for the Raiders in 2013, with 30 tackles and a fumble recovery on the year. In his time with the Raiders, he suffered two concussions over three games.

Adams signed with the Seahawks again on March 27, 2014. On August 30, 2014, he was released after continued struggles in training camp. He was claimed off waivers by the New York Jets on September 1, 2014. In 2014 for the Jets, Adams had one interception and 24 tackles in 12 games for the team. Adams was signed by the Atlanta Falcons on March 12, 2015. He played in 13 games for the Falcons in 2015, with one interception and 38 tackles. On April 5, 2016, Adams had a workout with the Kansas City Chiefs, but he did not return to the NFL. During training camp in 2016, the Indianapolis Colts called and asked Adams to participate in practice the following day, but Adams missed his flight. According to his former agent, "He made it to the Charlotte airport, but the flight had left already. I could tell his head was not in it. He'd given up on it."

NFL career statistics

Shooting and death

On April 7, 2021, Adams shot six people at a house in Rock Hill, South Carolina, killing five and fatally injuring a sixth who died on April 10. During a standoff with the police the next day, on April 8,  Adams shot himself, according to the York County Sheriff's Office. He was 32. Police said Adams' mother was inside the home during the standoff, but was "safely removed" before Adams killed himself. According to a neighbor, police used a loudspeaker and sent a robot into the house in a failed attempt to coax him out.

Adams had no prior criminal record. His father, Alonzo, suggested that his football career may have played a role in the shooting, stating that the sport "messed him up". An autopsy revealed that Adams suffered from an "unusually severe" case of the brain disease chronic traumatic encephalopathy.

See also
Concussions in American football
List of mass shootings in the United States

References

Further reading

External links

1988 births
2021 deaths
2021 murders in the United States
2021 suicides
21st-century American criminals
African-American players of American football
American football cornerbacks
American football players with chronic traumatic encephalopathy
American male criminals
American mass murderers
American murderers of children
Atlanta Falcons players
Crime in South Carolina
Criminals from South Carolina
Male murderers
Murder–suicides in South Carolina
New England Patriots players
New York Jets players
Oakland Raiders players
People from Rock Hill, South Carolina
Players of American football from South Carolina
Rock Hill High School (South Carolina) alumni
San Francisco 49ers players
Seattle Seahawks players
South Carolina State Bulldogs football players
Suicides by firearm in South Carolina